Keikhosrow Shahrokh
(1864 in Kerman, Sublime State of Persia – 1939) was the mastermind and designer of the mausoleum for Persian poet Ferdowsi at his burial site in the city of Tus. He is often credited with sparking the Persian nationalist movement which took place under the Pahlavi dynasty. Shahrokh helped reinstate Aryan pride in Iran through excavations of ancient relics near the Iranian city of Kerman. During his tenure in Iran's Revival Party he bolstered Iranian nationalism with numerous speeches and rallies across Shiraz, Kerman, and Tehran. As elected representative of the Zoroastrian community, he was an active member of the Iranian parliament. He is best known for his role in the 1925 transition of the official calendar from the Islamic calendar of Hejri Ghamarei to the Iranian civil calendar, also known as Hejri shamsi. 

Shahrokh often credited his pride of Persian descent to his hometown of Kerman which avoided miscegenation over thousands of years due to natural barriers such as the Lut desert and nearby mountains. Shahrokh was distantly related to Dinshah Irani, the Indian lawyer and benefactor of the Zoroastrian communities of both India and Iran. Shahrokh and Irani shared a late 18th-century ancestor, most of whose children migrated to India, and from which Dinshah Irani's family descended. Shahrokh was a scion of another branch, descending from the elder son - who had remained in Iran - of that ancestor.

See also 
 Qajar dynasty
 Iranian calendar
 Zoroastrians in Iran

References

External links
 Biography

http://www.zoroastrian.org.uk/vohuman/Article/Keikhosrow%20Shahrokh.htm

https://weblog.czc.org/2018/10/keikhosrow-shahrokh.html

https://amordadnews.com/en/87072/

Reza Shah

People from Kerman
1864 births
1929 deaths
Iranian Zoroastrians
Members of the 2nd Iranian Majlis
Members of the 3rd Iranian Majlis
Zoroastrians Representatives in National Consultative Assembly
Revival Party politicians
People from Kerman Province
19th-century Iranian politicians
20th-century Iranian politicians
Members of the 5th Iranian Majlis